The curling competition of the 2009 New Zealand Winter Games was held at the Maniototo Curling Rink in Naseby, New Zealand. Both the men's and women's competitions concluded on 29 August 2009. In the men's event Australia won gold after defeating China in the final, while in the women's event Japan won the gold, also beating China in the final.

Overview
The curling competition was held from 23 August to 29 August 2009 at the Maniototo Curling Rink in Naseby, New Zealand. It comprised a men's competition and a women's competition. Following the finals of both competitions an on-ice closing ceremony and medal presentation was held and then later an awards dinner.

The men's competition comprised a single round-robin format followed by a playoff round. Each team competed once against the other nations. At the end of the seven game each round-robin the top four nations progress to the playoff round. Japan, South Korea and Australia qualified after finishing first, second and third respectively. The fourth team through had to be determined with a tie-breaker game after China and the United States finished the round-robin finished with the same number of wins. China won the tie-breaker 9–6 and advanced to the semi-final. In the first semi-final Australia was drawn against South Korea. Australia won the semi-final 8–5 and progressed to the gold medal final while South Korea moved to the bronze medal final. China won the second semi-final against Japan with a score of 11–3, moving on to the gold medal final and Japan to the bronze medal final. Japan defeated South Korea in the bronze medal game 10–7 while in the gold medal game Australia defeated China 9–6.

The women's competition comprised a double round-robin format followed by a playoff round. Each team competed twice against the other nations. At the end of the eight game each round-robin the top four nations progress to the playoff round. China finished first in the round-robin and was drawn against fourth place New Zealand, while second placed Japan was drawn against South Korea. In the first semi-final Japan defeated South Korea 6–5 with Japan advancing to the gold medal final and South Korea moving on to the bronze medal final. China won the second semi-final defeating New Zealand with a score of 7–4 to move on to the gold medal game and New Zealand moved on to the bronze medal game. South Korea defeated New Zealand in the bronze medal game 12–7 while in the gold medal game Japan defeated China 8–5.

Medal table

Teams

Men

Women

Men's tournament

Round robin standings
Final round robin standings

Round robin results

Round 1
23 August 2009, 14:00

Round 2
24 August 2009, 08:00

Round 3
24 August 2009, 16:00

Round 4
25 August 2009, 13:00

Round 5
26 August 2009, 09:00

Round 6
26 August 2009, 17:00

Round 7
27 August 2009, 13:00

Tiebreaker
Owing to both China and the United States finishing with the same number of wins after the end of the round robin, a tiebreaker game was required to determine the fourth team to advance to the semi-final round. China won the game 9–6 and advanced to the second semi-final game against Japan.

28 August 2009, 08:00

Playoffs

Semifinals
28 August 2009, 11:45

28 August 2009, 15:00

Bronze medal final
29 August 2009, 13:45

Gold medal final
29 August 2009, 13:45

Women's tournament

Round robin standings
Final round robin standings

Round robin results

Round 1
23 August 2009, 08:45

Round 2
23 August 2009, 18:00

Round 3
24 August 2009, 12:00

Round 4
24 August 2009, 19:30

Round 5
25 August 2009, 09:00

Round 6
25 August 2009, 17:00

Round 7
26 August 2009, 13:00

Round 8
26 August 2009, 20:00

Round 9
27 August 2009, 09:00

Round 10
27 August 2009, 17:00

Playoffs

Semifinals
28 August 2009, 11:45

28 August 2009, 15:00

Bronze medal final
29 August 2009 – 09:45

Gold medal final
29 August 2009 – 09:45

References

New Zealand Winter Games
New Zealand Winter Games
Sport in Otago
2009 New Zealand Winter Games
Curling competitions in New Zealand
International sports competitions hosted by New Zealand